Joseph von Schork (7 December 1829 - 25 January 1905) was Archbishop of Bamberg from 1890 to the time of his death.

Early life and education

Born to a coachman in the service of the princes of Löwenstein-Wertheim-Rosenberg, von Schork attended Latin school in Miltenberg and the grammar school and lyceum in Aschaffenburg. Following this, he went on to study theology in Würzburg.

Career
Joseph von Schork was ordained in 1854 and began his career as a priest and school inspector in Würzburg. He was elected provost in 1889 and appointed as Archbishop of Bamberg in 1890 by Pope Leo XIII.

References

1829 births
1905 deaths
People from Miltenberg (district)
Archbishops of Bamberg
German Roman Catholic theologians
Members of the Bavarian Reichsrat